Andrew Kain (born 1 September 1985) is a former professional rugby league footballer who played at club level for the Castleford Tigers (Heritage No. 813), Widnes Vikings (Heritage No.), Featherstone Rovers (Heritage No. 901), Hunslet Hawks and the Dewsbury Rams, as a goal-kicking  or .

Career
Kain joined Featherstone Rovers on loan from the Widnes Vikings in 2007 and was part of the grand final-winning team, the loan deal was made permanent in 2008.

He announced his retirement in May 2017.

Genealogical information
Andy Kain is the cousin of the rugby league / who played in the 2000s and 2010s for the Featherstone Rovers (Heritage No. 923), and the Hunslet Hawks; Stuart Kain.

References

External links
(archived by web.archive.org) Profile at featherstonerovers.net
Andy Kain Memory Box Search at archive.castigersheritage.com

1985 births
Living people
Castleford Tigers players
Dewsbury Rams players
English rugby league players
Featherstone Rovers players
Hunslet R.L.F.C. players
Place of birth missing (living people)
Rugby league five-eighths
Rugby league halfbacks
Widnes Vikings players